The 1941 Washington Huskies football team was an American football team that represented the University of Washington during the 1941 college football season. In its 12th season under head coach Jimmy Phelan, the team compiled a 5–4 record, finished in second place in the Pacific Coast Conference, and outscored its opponents by a combined total of 120 to 94.

After the season in mid-December, Phelan and his two assistants were fired.  Assistant Ralph Welch was rehired as head coach for 1942.

Schedule

NFL Draft selections
Five University of Washington Huskies were selected in the 1942 NFL Draft, which lasted 22 rounds with 200 selections.

References

Washington
Washington Huskies football seasons
Washington Huskies football